Savaş Buldan (1961 – 3 June 1994) was a Kurdish businessman in Turkey. He was arrested by Turkish security forces and was found dead on 4 June 1994.

Life
Savaş Buldan was born in Yüksekova to Şükrü Buldan (father). His brother, Nejdet Buldan, is one of the former mayors of Yüksekova for the now defunct Democracy Party.

He was accused of carrying out activities in line with the Kurdistans Workers' Party (PKK) since 1979. The Public Prosecution Office launched a trial against him in connection with the incidents that took place in Yüksekova, Hakkari, in March 1979.

In 1980, Savaş Buldan allegedly sheltered some members of the PKK in his house after the clashes that took place between the PKK organization and the Kurdistan National Liberators (KUK) in Kızıltepe and Diyarbakır. In the same year, he and some other sympathizers carried out propaganda activities in the neighboring villages on the issue of "tribes". In 1986, he married his cousin Pervin Buldan.

He was among the persons, who provided lawyers for the persons, who were detained in connection with the Newroz incidents in March 1992.

In June 1992, when he was living in Istanbul, he got accused of supporting the PKK by the Turkish authorities.

Savaş Buldan was detained on 28 July 1992 in connection with certain arms seized in Haznedar neighborhood of İstanbul, and he was arrested by the SSC he was referred to.

Death and aftermath
Along with Adnan Yıldırım and Hacı Karay, he was abducted by the Turkish security forces from Çınar Hotel in Yeşilyurt, İstanbul, on 3 June 1994. The abducted persons were found dead on 4 June 1994 on the road of Yukarıkaraş village of Yığılca district of Bolu. On the 3 June, Pervin Buldan gave birth to their daughter Zelal Buldan. After several investigations by the European Court of Human Rights (ECHR), Turkey was seen guilty for his death and the Turkish government was sentenced to pay Buldan's wife Pervin Buldan 10,000 Euros and to his brother Nejdet Buldan 16,000 Euros. In 2021, the Turkish crime boss Sedat Peker accused Mehmet Agar of being responsible for Buldans death.

Personal life 
On the 3 June, Pervin Buldan gave birth to their daughter Zelal Buldan. Zelal would release a movie in memory of her father called Katharsis in June 2020. Following Savaş Buldan's murder, his brother, Nejdet Buldan, fled Turkey and settled in Germany.

See also
List of kidnappings
List of solved missing person cases
List of unsolved murders

References

External links
 (contains the Susurluk reports in English)

1961 births
1990s missing person cases
1994 deaths
Formerly missing people
Kidnapped people
Male murder victims
Missing person cases in Turkey
People from Hakkâri
Turkish arms traffickers
Turkish drug traffickers
Turkish murder victims
Turkish people of Kurdish descent
Unsolved murders in Turkey
Turkish crime bosses
1994 murders in Turkey